Zhao Yong (赵庸) was a military general who was executed by Zhu Yuanzhang during the Ming dynasty as part of the Hu Weiyong case (during which Zhu executed 30,000 people).

History 
Zhao Yong was from Luzhou (廬州) in Henan Jiangbei province (today Hefei, Anhui). In his early years, he and his brother Zhao Zhongzhong (赵仲中) guarded Shuizhai (水寨) and stationed troops in Chao Lake (巢湖). Later he joined Zhu Yuanzhang.

Later, he was promoted to participate in political affairs, attacked Kanglangshan (康郎山) with Liao Yongzhong (廖永忠) and others, and then occupied Wuchang, Luzhou, Anfeng, Huaidong, Hai'an and Taizhou (武昌、廬州、安豐、淮東、海安、泰州). He was then promoted to Zhongshu Zuocheng (中书左丞), after which he attacked Shandong. 

In the first year of Hongwu, he also served as the deputy minister of Prince Zhan (兼任太子副詹事), and later attacked Henan, Hebei, Shanxi and Shaanxi with the army. He followed Chang Yuchun to fight the Northern Yuan. Then he attacked Qingyang and Yingchang with Li Wenzhong (李文忠). Although Zhao made a big contribution, because he captured slaves in Yingchang, he was not given the title of Duke, so he became Marquess Nanxiong (南雄侯). He then pacified rebellions in Fujian and Guangdong, where Zhu beheaded more than 8,000 people.

In the 20th year of Hongwu (1387), he went to Gubeikou (古北口) with Zhu Di, the prince of Yan. Later, Zhao Yong was executed because he was implicated in the Hu Weiyong case. His brother Zhao Zhongzhong was also executed by Zhu.

See also 

 Hu Weiyong, executed by Zhu Yuanzhang along with 30,000 others
 Lan Yu (general), executed by Zhu Yuanzhang along with 15,000 others

References

Bibliography
Zhang Tingyu. History of Ming.

14th-century executions
Executed Ming dynasty people
Executed people from Anhui
Generals from Anhui
Ming dynasty generals
Ming dynasty politicians
People executed by the Ming dynasty
Yuan dynasty people
Year of birth unknown
Victims of familial execution